Hadena capsincola is a moth of the family Noctuidae. It was described by Michael Denis and Ignaz Schiffermüller in 1775. It is found from Siberia to central Europe.

The wingspan is 26–34 mm. The ground colour is black brownish. There are one to three generations per year.

The larvae feed on Silene species, including S. vulgaris and S. alba. The species overwinters in the pupal stage.

Taxonomy
Hadena capsincola was previously treated as a synonym of Hadena bicruris.

References

Moths described in 1775
Hadena
Moths of Europe
Moths of Asia